Perochirus ateles, also known as Dumeril's tropical gecko or Micronesia saw-tailed gecko, is a species of lizard in the family Gekkonidae. It is endemic to Micronesia.

References

Perochirus
Reptiles described in 1856